Hiking, rock climbing, and mountain climbing around Tuolumne Meadows in Yosemite National Park has many options.

Hiking and rock climbing, a note on granite domes

Granite domes are common in Tuolumne, and, throughout Yosemite National Park. There is a separate page, all about granite domes of Yosemite. At present, its references focus on rock climbing, but others are free, to add references about hiking. It is available under Granite Domes of Yosemite National Park, as the page is not specific to Tuolumne Meadows; the table of domes may be sorted, so you may look at a chosen area.

Hiking

Many backcountry hiking and backpacking trails start in or near Tuolumne Meadows. The John Muir Trail and the Pacific Crest Trails are long-distance backpacking trails that go through Lyell Canyon into Tuolumne Meadows. Tuolumne Meadows also feature a wide range of day trails. Day hike trails are popular, and get busy in the summer high season. These trails are serviced by the Tuolumne Meadows shuttle bus, typically from June to September, though dates vary due to weather.

Hiking destinations:

 Bennettville, a ghost town
 Budd Lake (California)
 Cathedral Lakes,
 Conness Glacier,
 Dana Meadows,
 Dog Lake,
 Donohue Pass
 Elizabeth Lake,
 Gaylor Lakes
 Glen Aulin,
 Hall Natural Area,
 John Muir Trail,
 Lyell Canyon, via the John Muir Trail,
 Lyell Meadow,
 Mono Pass,
 Parsons Lodge,
 Soda Springs,
 Soda Springs Cabin,
 Tioga Pass,
 Vogelsang High Sierra Camp, one of many High Sierra Camps in the Sierra Nevada,
 Waterwheel Falls,
 Young Lakes

Rock climbing

In Tuolumne, rock climbing is popular, and there are many granite domes, there and elsewhere in Yosemite.

In contrast to the big walls of Yosemite Valley, climbing at Tuolumne generally consists of short- to medium-length routes on eleven major domes and several minor ones; see Granite Domes of Yosemite National Park. As the area is all at a high elevation, climbing season is mainly limited to June through September.

In Tuolumne, granite tends to be knobby, moreso than Yosemite Valley.

The rock is porphyritic granite, a very strong form of granite, plus granodiorite; see Cathedral Peak Granodiorite and Kuna Crest Granodiorite. It has a tendency to exfoliation, which produces and preserves distinctive "onion dome" shapes. Resulting climbing includes both face and crack routes, face routes often runout due to limited numbers of bolts, and crack routes frequently following very thin cracks.

Many domes are in Tuolumne area. Major (and minor) domes include:

 Daff Dome,
 Dog Dome
 Dozier Dome,
 Fairview Dome,
 Harlequin Dome,
 Lembert Dome,
 Mariolumne Dome,
 Marmot Dome,
 Medlicott Dome,
 Polly Dome,
 Pothole Dome,
 Puppy Dome,
 Stately Pleasure Dome

Echo Peaks have been hiked, but are usually rock-climbed, as Ragged Peak may be scrambled, but is also rock climbed. Mountain that are not usually walk-ups, but typically rock-climbs:
 Cockscomb,
 Echo Peaks,
 Ragged Peak
 Unicorn Peak,

Mountain climbing

Around Tuolumne Meadows, mountain climbing is quite popular; for the highest mountains in the entire park, see the highest mountains of Yosemite National Park.

A few mountains that can be climbed, out of Tuolumne Meadows:

 Amelia Earhart Peak
 Banner Peak
 Blacktop Peak
 Cathedral Peak, and Eichorn Pinnacle,
 Donohue Peak
 Echo Ridge,
 Electra Peak
 Excelsior Mountain
 False White Mountain,
 Johnson Peak, the highest mountain in Tuolumne area,
 Kuna Crest
 Kuna Peak,
 Mammoth Peak,
 Matthes Crest,
 Matterhorn Peak,
 Mount Conness,
 Mount Dana,
 Mount Davis
 Mount Florence,
 Mount Gibbs,
 Mount Hoffmann,
 Mount Lyell, the highest peak in Yosemite National Park,
 Mount Maclure,
 North Peak,
 Parsons Peak,
 Rodgers Peak,
 Shepherd Crest
 Simmons Peak
 Tioga Peak,
 Tresidder Peak,
 Tuolumne Peak,
 Virginia Peak
 Vogelsang Peak,
 White Mountain

See also

 List of Yosemite destinations
 Tuolumne Meadows
 Yosemite National Park
 Yosemite Valley

References

External links

Trails

 Day hikes in Tuolumne Meadows
 Hiking Tuolumne Meadows area
 Hiking the Tuolumne area
 On Tuolumne trails
 More on Tuolumne trails
 And more on Tuolumne trails
 Still more on Tuolumne trails
 The trail to Elizabeth Lake

Horseback riding
 Horseback riding, in Tuolumne
 Horse Riding and Mule Packing in the Ansel Adams Wilderness

Rock climbing

 Tuolumne rock climbing information
 More on rock climbing
 Rock climbing regulations
 General information on Tuolumne rock climbs
 Rock climbing routes in Tuolumne Meadows area
 Glen Aulin rock climbing

Mountain climbing

 The hike to and climb of Cockscomb, and Unicorn Peak— requires rock climbing
 The hike to, and up Cockscomb
 The hike to, and up Echo Peaks
 The hike to and climb of Mount Conness
 The hike to, and up Parsons Peak
 The hike to, and up White Mountain

Yosemite National Park
Sierra Nevada (United States)
Tourist attractions in Tuolumne County, California
Landforms of Tuolumne County, California
Tourist attractions in Mariposa County, California